The Court of Final Appeal Building, also known as the Old Supreme Court Building, is the home of the Court of Final Appeal of Hong Kong. It housed the former Supreme Court from 1912 to 1983 and the Legislative Council from 1985 to 2011. It is located at 8 Jackson Road, in Central, along the eastern side of Statue Square, directly west of Chater Garden. As the Old Supreme Court, its exterior is one of the declared monuments of Hong Kong.

History
The building was designed by Sir Aston Webb and Ingress Bell, the British architects responsible for the eastern façade of Buckingham Palace and the Cromwell Road frontage of the Victoria and Albert Museum in London.

Construction of the building started in 1900 and it was opened on 15 January 1912 by the Governor Sir Frederick Lugard. The two-storey granite building is neo-classical in style supported by Ionic columns. It is surmounted by a 2.7 m high blindfolded statue of Justice, represented by Themis, the Greek Goddess of Justice and Law. This statue was inspired by the one erected at London's Old Bailey.

During the Japanese occupation of Hong Kong (December 1941 to August 1945), the building was used as the headquarters of the Kempeitai (Military Police).

In 1978, this building was severely affected by the construction of MTR, requiring restoration work. As a consequence, for part of the early 1980s, the Supreme Court was moved to the Former French Mission Building, which was then used by the Victoria District Court.

In 1985, the building took up service as home to the Legislative Council, when it was known as 'the Legislative Council Building', while the Supreme Court moved to the Supreme Court Building in Admiralty - renamed the High Court Building in 1997.

In 2011, the Legislative Council moved into the new Legislative Council Complex within the Central Government Complex at Tamar site.

On 7 September 2015, the building reverted to its former judicial function. It now houses the Court of Final Appeal. The opening ceremony was held on 25 September 2015 by the Chief Justice of the Court of Final Appeal Geoffrey Ma Tao-li.

Architectural features
The building was erected on reclaimed land. Its foundation was formed by driving hundreds of Chinese fir tree trunks into the mixture of reclamation materials and silt on the site. As a consequence, the Building is in effect "floating" on a timber raft. Such a foundation system requires the groundwater level to be maintant level, and a groundwater replenishment system is installed to replace groundwater as required.

The plan of the building follows a rectangular pattern and is symmetrical.

A pediment surmounts the central section of the building facing Statue Square. The pediment is topped by a Statue of Justice and under it is the inscription "Erected AD MDCCCCX" (Erected AD 1910). The pediment incorporates a semi-circular window and the carving of the British Royal Coat of Arms is above it. The shield shows the various royal emblems of the various parts of the United Kingdom: the three lions of England in the first and fourth quarters, the lion of Scotland in the second and the harp of Ireland in the third. The shield is supported by the English lion and Scottish unicorn and is surmounted by the royal crown. The motto of the sovereign, Dieu et mon droit (God and my right), is displayed underneath it. The figures of Mercy and Truth are located on both sides of the British Royal Arms.

Gallery

Interior of the building as the Legislative Council Building (1985 to 2011)

See also

 Court of Final Appeal (Hong Kong)
 Supreme Court (Hong Kong)
 Legislative Council Complex
 Central and Western Heritage Trail
 Former Central Magistracy
 List of buildings and structures in Hong Kong

References

External links

 Antiquities and Monuments Office: The Old Supreme Court

Government buildings in Hong Kong
National supreme court buildings
Declared monuments of Hong Kong
Central, Hong Kong
Landmarks in Hong Kong
Government buildings completed in 1912
British colonial architecture
1912 establishments in Hong Kong